Vatica lanceaefolia is a species of plant in the family Dipterocarpaceae.

Distribution
Vatica lanceaefolia is found in Bangladesh, India, and Myanmar-Burma.

It is a Critically endangered species threatened by habitat loss.

References

lanceaefolia
Flora of Assam (region)
Flora of Arunachal Pradesh
Flora of Bangladesh
Flora of Myanmar
Critically endangered flora of Asia
Taxonomy articles created by Polbot
Taxobox binomials not recognized by IUCN